This is a list of electoral division results for the Northern Territory 2012 General Election.

Overall results

Results by Electoral Division

Arafura 

The Labor member for Arafura, Marion Scrymgour, announced her retirement from politics in March 2012, citing a desire to focus on community work. Having represented the seat since 2001, Scrymgour had been Deputy Chief Minister from 2007 to February 2009, when she resigned from the Labor Party after difficulties in her Education portfolio. Having rejoined the ALP in August following Alison Anderson's move to the crossbenches, Scrymgour's battle with thyroid cancer and the death of her father had contributed to a decreased public presence and she did not return to the ministry.

To replace Scrymgour, Labor nominated former Australian rules footballer Dean Rioli, whose uncle Maurice Rioli had been Scrymgour's predecessor in the seat. The Country Liberals endorsed the deputy chair of the Tiwi Land Council, Francis Maralampuwi Xavier, a fellow Tiwi Islander who was also related to Rioli; Xavier had been a former Labor preselection candidate who had defected to the conservative side of politics. The Greens nominated George Pascoe, who had previously contested the seat in 2005, while the new First Nations Party nominated Jeannie Gadambua.

Arafura was one of the seats that was too close to call on election night, and together with Stuart it remained in doubt for some days after the election. The CLP's sizeable primary vote lead was narrowed by a strong flow of Greens preferences to Labor, although the First Nations Party, in common with most other seats it contested, directed preferences to the CLP. Xavier led Rioli by 148 votes when election night counting finished, but this was narrowed to 47 during counting the following week. Xavier's final margin over Rioli was 62 votes, which amounted to a 15 per cent swing to the Country Liberals. This was the first time Labor had lost Arafura since its creation in 1983.

Araluen 

The sitting member for Alice Springs-based Araluen, Robyn Lambley, had won the seat for the CLP at a 2010 by-election, triggered by the resignation of former opposition leader Jodeen Carney. The Labor candidate was local chef Adam Findlay, who had also contested the by-election. Araluen was the CLP's safest seat, although Findlay made opposition to the Angela Pamela uranium mine a central plank of his campaign. The First Nations Party nominated Edan Baxter, a musician, entrepreneur and former candidate for local council, who was one of the party's two non-indigenous candidates.

The absence of a Greens candidate saw all candidates increase their share of the primary vote. Araluen was one of four seats that saw a two-party-preferred swing towards Labor, together with Fannie Bay, Greatorex and Sanderson, although the result was an improvement on Lambley's by-election margin. Following the election, Lambley surprised observers by defeating existing deputy leader Kezia Purick in a party room ballot and becoming Deputy Chief Minister, a decision that was attributed to the desire to have a rural MP as the deputy.

Arnhem

Barkly

Blain

Braitling

Brennan

Casuarina

Daly

Drysdale

Fannie Bay

Fong Lim

Goyder

Greatorex

Johnston

Karama

Katherine

Namatjira

Nelson

Nhulunbuy

Nightcliff

Port Darwin

Sanderson

Stuart

Wanguri

References 

Elections in the Northern Territory
Results of Northern Territory elections